Deuveotrechus is a genus of beetles in the family Carabidae, containing the following species:

 Deuveotrechus gregoryi Jeannel, 1937
 Deuveotrechus yinae Ueno, 1996
 Deuveotrechus yuae Deuve, 1992

References

Trechinae